Ghio Wetland Nature Reserve is a wetland nature reserve that lies near the Boesmans River, south of the Indalo Protected Environment, near Kenton-on-Sea.

History 
This  reserve was established in 1985.

See also 

 List of protected areas of South Africa

References 

Nature reserves in South Africa
Protected areas of South Africa